Fiction is a story created by the imagination in any medium (e.g., moving pictures, plays, etc.).

Fiction may also refer to:

Arts, entertainment, and media

Literature
Prose fiction, "literature in the form of prose, especially short stories and novels, that describes imaginary events and people" (New Oxford American Dictionary)
Science fiction

Music

Groups and labels
 Fiction Records, The Cure's former record label
 Fictional (band), Funker Vogt side project led by Gerrit Thomas

Albums
 Fiction (The Comsat Angels album), 1982
 Fiction (Yuki Kajiura album), 2003
 Fiction (Dark Tranquillity album), 2007
 Fiction (Mukala album), 1998
 Fiction (Yoga Lin album), 2012
 Fictions (album) by Jane Birkin, 2006
 Fiction (EP), 2020 EP by Suuns

Songs
 "Fiction" (Coldrain song), a single by Coldrain from their 2009 album Final Destination
 "Fiction", a song by Joni Mitchell from her 1985 album Dog Eat Dog
 "Fiction", a song by Whipping Boy from their 1995 album Heartworm
 "Fiction", a song by Nik Kershaw from his 1999 album 15 Minutes
 "Fiction", a song by Kids in the Way
 "Fiction", a song by Belle and Sebastian from their 2002 album Storytelling
 "Fiction" (Avenged Sevenfold song), a song by Avenged Sevenfold from their 2010 album Nightmare
 "Fiction", a song by Beast from their 2011 album 
 "Fiction", a song by The xx from their 2012 album Coexist

Other arts, entertainment, and media
 Ficció (Fiction), a 2006 Spanish film directed by Cesc Gay
Fiksi. (Fiction), a 2008 Indonesian film directed by Mouly Surya
 Fiction Magazine, an American literary magazine

Other uses
 Design Fiction, critical design, which takes a critical theory based approach to design
 Legal fiction, a legal term

de:Fiktion (Begriffsklärung)